Sunil (Sunil Shetty) (1 April 1964 – 24 July 1994) was an Indian actor in Kannada cinema. Some of the notable films of Sunil as an actor include Shruthi (1990), Mana Mecchida Sose (1992), Belli Kalungura (1992)  and Shambhavi (1992).

Career
Sunil had been part of more than thirty Kannada feature films.

Death
In 1994, actress Malashri and Sunil met with a car accident when their car was hit by a truck. While Malashri suffered multiple injuries, Sunil died within an hour.

Selected filmography

 Bisi Raktha (1989)
 Shruthi (1990)
 Nadasurabhi (1991)
 C. B. I. Shiva (1991)
 Nagu Naguta Nali (1991) 
Thavarumane Udugore (1991)
Anatha Rakshaka (1991)
 Mangalya (1991) 
Amma Kadupu Chellaga (1991; Telugu)
 Halli Krishna Delhi Radha (1992)
 Obbarigintha Obbaru (1992) 
 Malashree Mamashree (1992)
 Mana Mecchida Sose (1992)
 Nagaradalli Nayakaru (1992)
 Snehada Kadalalli (1992)
 Belli Kalungura (1992)
 Nagaradalli Nayakaru (1992)
 Sindhoora Thilaka (1992)
 Sahasi (1992)
 Marana Mrudanga (1992)
 Kaliyuga Seethe (1992)
 Shambhavi / Devar Veettu Ponnu (Tamil) (1992)
 Urmila (1993; Telugu)
 Dakshayini (1993)
 Mecchida Madumaga (1993)
 September 8 (1994) 
 Panjarada Gili (1994)

See also

List of people from Karnataka
Cinema of Karnataka
List of Indian film actors
Cinema of India

References

1964 births
1994 deaths
20th-century Indian male actors
21st-century Indian male actors
Indian male film actors
Male actors from Karnataka
Male actors in Kannada cinema
Place of death missing